The Santerians are a fictional superhero team appearing in American comic books published by Marvel Comics. The group debuted in Daredevil: Father #2 (Oct. 2005) after they were mentioned in Daredevil: Father #1 with a brief appearance of their leader Eleggua. The Santerians were created by writer, artist and editor Joe Quesada. Consisting of five members, they are Eleggua, Oshun, Chango, Ogun and Oya.

Group Origins and History
After a street gang war in the Bronx involving drugs, a young Nestor Rodriguez puts together a neighborhood watch group called the "Street Angels" to help clean up crime after being inspired by his Councilman father, unaware that his father is being to work for local gangsters.

Nestor overhears a secret meeting between his father and the gangsters. The gangsters' boss is trying to tell Nestor's father that his son's Street Angel crew are getting in the way of their criminal activities; he wants Nestor's father to do something to stop it once and for all. They spot Nestor in the room and the gangster boss hands Nestor's father a gun and tells him to kill his son.

Nestor's father attempts to shoot the boss instead of Nestor, and is shot dead himself instead. Nestor is left alive because they do not see him as a threat. After the gangsters leave, Daredevil finds Nestor crying with his dead father, too late to help.

At his father's funeral, Nestor is visited by a mysterious voodoo priest who takes him under his wing and teaches him about the ancient Santerian religion, a blend of Catholicism and African Yoruba beliefs. Through his training with the priest, Nestor obtains mystical superpowers by means which include sacrificing chickens and drinking their blood in a magic potion.

As an adult Nestor uses his powers and takes the superhero alias "Eleggua". He decides to form his own superhero team to fight crime in New York, by finding four other members of the Street angels gang who want to help the city. Like Nestor, they take aliases based on the religious nature of their newfound powers - Oshun, Ogun, Chango and Oya. The team patrols the streets and training together, leaving their name "Santerians" behind them after breaking up a drug ring. 

Nestor grows disillusioned with Daredevil, confronts him and decides that the Santerians will make a difference in the city instead. Daredevil wins back the respect of the Santerians after confronting them to get payback for their initial argument, and solving a murder with the group.

Powers of Santerians 
The Santerians each have their own special powers which are derived from the Orishas, deities of the ancient Santerian religion that they practiced under during their adolescent years.

Eleggua - Leader of the Santerians, Eleggua has the power to understand thoughts, languages and texts. He can also cause confusion or alter communication and drive others to insanity.

Oshun - Oshun, named after the Orisha of rivers and streams, has the ability to control and manipulate any liquid, including the liquids inside a person.

Ogun - Ogun named after the Orisha of war, and has super-strength, enough to level a building.

Chango - Chango is named after the Orisha of fire and passion, he can create control electricity from his fingertips.

Oya - Oya is named after the Orisha of storms. She has the power to control the weather, manipulate winds and fly through the air.

References

External links
 Santerians at Comic Vine
 
 

Marvel Comics superhero teams
2005 comics debuts
American comics characters
Characters created by Joe Quesada
Comics characters introduced in 2005
Marvel Comics titles
Superhero comics